Chaina Bhabish is the debut studio album by Bangladeshi singer, songwriter Arnob, released on 1 June 2005 by Ektaar Music. The album was mixed, mastered and engineered by Arnob himself. It featured the hit song "She Je Boshe Ache". The album artwork was also drawn by Arnob himself. Since the release of the album Arnob gained huge popularity among the youth of Bangladesh.

After leaving his band Bangla, Arnob signed a contract with Ektaar Music and started recording in March, which ended in May 2005. Only two songs in this album was written by Arnob, "She Je Boshe Ache" and "Chuya Chuyi". This album was both well received by people and have sold over 250,000 copies in Bangladesh and is considered to be one of the best-selling albums of the decade.

Track listing 
Most of the songs were written by Sahana Bajpaie, except where noted.

Personnel 

 Arnob - lead vocals, acoustic guitars

Additional personnel
 Sahana Bajpaie - backing vocals

Production
 Recorded at - Ektaar Music Studio
 Sound engineering and mixing by - Arnob 
 Cover artwork by - Arnob

References

2005 albums
Experimental music albums